Ray Mears Goes Walkabout is a survival television series hosted by Ray Mears, showing Mears in Australia. The series aired from 2008 on the BBC in United Kingdom, and was also shown on Discovery Channel in Canada, India, Italy, Brazil, New Zealand, Australia, Norway, Sweden, the Netherlands, Russia, and the United States.

A book of the same title was released concurrently with the series. In the series Mears met one of his heroes: Les Hiddins (aka "The Bush Tucker Man").

Synopsis
Ray Mears journeys through the wilderness of the Australian outback to learn about the people, the wildlife, and the culture. He is joined by Australian survival experts who enrich his journey and deepen Mears's understanding of Australian bushcraft. These journeys encompass many of the themes of Mears's world discovery: the natural world, indigenous culture, adventure and survival.

External links
RayMears.com

2000s American reality television series
British reality television series
Works about survival skills
2008 British television series debuts
2008 British television series endings